João Vitor França dos Santos (born 15 December 1998) is a Brazilian professional basketball player with Unifacisa Basquete in the NBB.

References

Brazilian men's basketball players
Flamengo basketball players
Novo Basquete Brasil players
1998 births
Living people
Centers (basketball)
Basketball players from Rio de Janeiro (city)